Elhamma toxopeusi is a species of moth of the family Hepialidae. It is known from New Guinea.

References

External links
Hepialidae genera

Moths described in 1952
Hepialidae